Skelleftehamn is a locality situated in Skellefteå Municipality, Västerbotten County, Sweden with 3,184 inhabitants in 2010.

Notable people
 Stieg Larsson, journalist, writer and author of crime fiction/thriller Millennium trilogy.
 Victoria Silvstedt, model, actress, singer and television personality.

References

External links

Populated places in Västerbotten County
Populated places in Skellefteå Municipality